Hepingmen, literally meaning the Gate of Peace, was a gate in Beijing's former city wall. In the 1960s, the gate was torn down to make room for Beijing's second ring road. Today, Hepingmen is a transport node in Beijing as well as the location of Hepingmen Station on Line 2 of Beijing's subway system.

References

Gates of Beijing
Neighbourhoods of Beijing
Road transport in Beijing
Xicheng District